Francesco Baglietto (2 September 1826 – 24 February 1916) was an Italian physician and botanist, known for his studies on cryptogams, particularly on lichens.

Biography
Francesco Baglietto was born in Voltri, Italy, on 2 September 1816. A pupil of Giuseppe De Notaris, Baglietto specialized in the study of lichens, a subject on which he left numerous publications. The society had the aim of creating and publishing the Italian cryptogamic herbarium, intended to be an all-encompassing collection of all types of cryptogams, including mosses, lichens, ferns, and mushrooms. Together with V. de Cesati and G. de Notaris, Baglietto published two series of the exsiccata work Erbario crittogamico Italiano with altogether 3000 numbered units (distributed in an unknown number of sets), the first series with "volumes" grouped in 30 issues  and the second series in two parts, one with 10 issues. 

In 1871 Baglietto published Prospetto lichenologico della Toscana in which, combining everything that had been published by previous lichenologists and adding copious material gleaned from some private collections, he enumerated 411 species of lichens collected in Tuscany and the adjacent islands. Giovanni Battista De Toni (1864–1925) bought Baglietto's lichen herbarium for the sum of £. 2000, a collection that is now kept in the Botanical Institute of Modena. Other parts of his collection are kept at the Natural History Museum in Genoa. Baglietto's collection of cryptogams is considered to be one of the most important of its kind in Europe.

Baglietto died in Genoa on 24 February 1916.

Three lichen genera named after Baglietto are Bagliettoa , Parabagliettoa , and Protobagliettoa .

Selected publications

See also
 :Category:Taxa named by Francesco Baglietto

References

1826 births
1916 deaths
Italian lichenologists
19th-century Italian physicians
20th-century Italian scientists
19th-century Italian botanists
Physicians from Genoa
Scientists from Genoa